Poul Erik Andreasen (born 17 December 1949) is a Danish ex-football (soccer) player and manager, who managed the Danish Superliga side Aalborg BK (AaB) during their 1994-95 Superliga victory. In 1996-1999 he coached Norwegian Viking FK from Stavanger. He is currently a youth coach at AaB. In his active career, he played more than 100 games for AaB between 1973 and 1978.

External links 
 Danish national team profile
 AaB profile

 

1949 births
Living people
Danish men's footballers
Danish football managers
Nørresundby FB players
AaB Fodbold players
AaB Fodbold managers
Viking FK managers
Vejle Boldklub managers
Danish Superliga managers
Eliteserien managers
Danish expatriate football managers
Expatriate football managers in Norway
Danish expatriate sportspeople in Norway
Association football forwards